Arun Kumar is an Indian civil servant who formerly served as Additional Secretary to Government of India, Secretary of Oil Industry Development Board and Executive Director of Petroleum Conservation Research Association. He also served as Board Director-Incharge of Indian Strategic Petroleum Reserves Limited, Member of the Management Advisory Committee of Bureau of Energy Efficiency (under Ministry of Power) and Member of the Governing council of Centre for High Technology (under Ministry of Petroleum and Natural Gas).

He is a 1976 batch Central Secretariat Service officer.

Career
Kumar joined the Central Secretariat Service in 1974 after qualifying through the Civil Services Examination.  He rose through ranks and was later empanelled as Additional Secretary to Government of India in Ministry of Petroleum and Natural Gas in October 2010 by the Appointments Committee of the Cabinet.

References

External links
 Executive Profile: Arun Kumar
 OIDB Annual Report 2011-12 : Members of the Board - Oil Industry Development Board
 Members of the Governing Council / General Body of Center for High Technology by Centre for High Technology Archived Copy
 Focus on energy conservation by The Hindu 
 Energy park to be set up in Bhubaneswar by The Hindu 
 Experts' plea to save energy by The Times of India 
 ONGC bags Best Overall Performance Award amongst upstream Sector Oil Cos

1953 births
Living people
People from Bihar
Indian civil servants
Indian government officials
Central Secretariat Service officers
Indian business executives
Place of birth missing (living people)